"Love Bug Leave My Heart Alone" is a 1967 single released by Motown girl group Martha and the Vandellas. The song's production was a departure from the Vandellas' repertoire as their label, Motown, was having a harder time staying with the times in the music industry and having a much harder time finding a hit for its acts after several departures including Vandellas collaborators William "Mickey" Stevenson and Holland-Dozier-Holland, who produced the b-side to this single, "One Way Out", one of the trio's final recordings with the Vandellas. Produced by Richard Morris, the song displayed of the narrator wanting "the love bug" (i.e., her former lover) to leave her alone so she won't "fall in love". The narrator, lead singer Martha Reeves, was left heart-broken the last time she allowed the man to come back to her but after suffering heartbreak, she expresses her disgust at the man's attempts, with her fellow members Rosalind Ashford and Betty Kelley chanting "get outta there, love bug, leave my heart alone". The song (with its unusual-for-Motown fuzz guitar) was their second consecutive Top 40 single of 1967 peaking at number twenty-five on the Billboard pop singles chart and number fourteen on the Billboard Hot R&B singles chart. The record was the first track ever played on UK Radio One by DJ John Peel.

Personnel
Lead vocals by Martha Reeves
Background vocals by Rosalind Ashford and Betty Kelly
Instrumentation by The Funk Brothers
Written by Richard Morris and Sylvia Moy
Produced by Richard Morris

References

1967 songs
1967 singles
Martha and the Vandellas songs
Songs written by Sylvia Moy
Songs written by Richard Morris (songwriter)
Gordy Records singles